Ayoub Bodaghi (born 21 March 1948) is an Iranian sprinter. He competed in the men's 100 metres at the 1976 Summer Olympics.

References

1948 births
Living people
Athletes (track and field) at the 1976 Summer Olympics
Iranian male sprinters
Olympic athletes of Iran
Place of birth missing (living people)